The Avia BH-1 was a two-seat sports plane built in Czechoslovakia in 1920. It was the first product of the Avia company, and it was originally designated BH-1 exp. The BH-1 was a low-wing braced monoplane of wooden construction, with tailskid undercarriage. Power was provided by a Daimler engine, which proved inadequate to fly the aircraft with both seats occupied.

Soon after its first flight, it was exhibited at the inaugural International Aviation Exhibition in Prague. Its reception there was so enthusiastic that Czechoslovak president Tomáš Masaryk awarded Avia a 100,000 CSK development grant.

The BH-1 was subsequently rebuilt with a Gnome Omega rotary engine and was finally able to fly with two people aboard. It was known as the BH-1 bis in this configuration, and in 1921 won the Czechoslovak national cross-country rally with an average speed of 125 km/h (78 mph) over the 860 km (536 mi) course. The aircraft was damaged in a crash the following spring and was never repaired, having been surpassed by improved designs.

In 2004, Marcel Sezemský built a flying replica of the aircraft, powered by a Walter Mikron engine.

Specifications (BH-1 exp)

References

 
 
 vyrobce.cz

Single-engined tractor aircraft
Low-wing aircraft
1920s Czechoslovakian sport aircraft
BH-01
Aircraft first flown in 1920